Celaenorrhinus boadicea, commonly known as Boadicea's sprite, is a species of butterfly in the family Hesperiidae. It is found in Nigeria, Cameroon, Gabon, the Republic of the Congo, the Democratic Republic of the Congo, Uganda, Tanzania and Zambia. The habitat consists of forests, but it is also found in agricultural lands with a full canopy.

Subspecies
Celaenorrhinus boadicea boadicea (Nigeria, Cameroon, Gabon, Congo, eastern Democratic Republic of the Congo, Zambia)
Celaenorrhinus boadicea howarthi Berger, 1976 (Democratic Republic of the Congo: Ituri, Uganda, north-western Tanzania)

References

Butterflies described in 1877
boadicea
Butterflies of Africa
Taxa named by William Chapman Hewitson